Merian may refer to

People with the surname
 Merian family, Swiss patrician family from Basel
 Matthäus Merian the Elder (1593–1650), Swiss-German engraver and publisher
 Matthäus Merian the Younger (1621–1687), Swiss painter
 Maria Sibylla Merian (1647–1717), naturalist and scientific illustrator
 Johann Bernhard Merian (1723–1807), Swiss philosopher
 Christoph Merian (1800–1858), Swiss banker, businessman and rentier
 Merian C. Cooper (1893—1973), American aviator and writer, director of King Kong
 Charles Merian Cooper (1856–1923), American congressman from Florida
 Leon Merian (born Leon Megerdichian) (1923-2007), American jazz trumpeter

Other
 Merian (magazine), a German travel magazine
 Plan de Mérian, a map of Paris, France created in 1615
 Villa Merian, a Villa in Münchenstein, Switzerland 
 Christoph Merian Stiftung, a non-profit-making public utility institution in Basel, Switzerland
 48458 Merian, a minor planet named after Matthäus Merian
 RV Maria S. Merian (launched 2005), a German research vessel

See also

 Meriam (disambiguation)
 Marian (disambiguation)
 Meridian (disambiguation)

Swiss-German surnames